Glasskabet (The Glass Cabinet) is a short story written in 1847 by Bernhard Severin Ingemann. 

The story is about Mr. Seyfert, a rich businessman from London. In order to keep his dead wife's fortune he embalms her and puts her in a glass cabinet in his bedroom, since their prenuptial agreement stated that the wife's relatives would inherit when she was buried.

After the death of his wife Mr. Seyfert unworriedly goes bankrupt, and to pay the accumulated  bills he goes to fetch some diamonds that he has hidden in his wife's shroud. However, they are not there, and he imagines that his wife talks to him and finally attacks him. In the morning he's found with his wife's corpse on top of him, and he has become insane. He's committed to an insane asylum where he eventually dies.

References

1847 short stories